The Nix is a 2016 novel, the first by Nathan Hill.

Plot 

The Nix is an American epic novel in 10 parts that follows community college professor of English, Samuel Andresen-Anderson who is struggling to find meaning in his life in the years following his failure to write a book which he was already paid an advance for. He was abandoned by his mother at a young age. Samuel seeks comfort in junk food, an acerbic inner-monologue, and a Second-Life-style internet game called Elfscape and generally struggles to find motivation or self-respect. One day, Samuel discovers that the mother who abandoned him has become a radical leftist activist who is under arrest for assaulting a public figure. When his editor (still after him for the writing for which he was given an advance) persuades Samuel to track down his mother, Samuel must confront and discover the various serpentine, complex, and at times, humorous figures and sub-plots from his youth to arrive. The book captures various periods of his mother's life and touches on many themes including isolation, friendship, love, life purpose, the Vietnam War, the Iraq War, feminine oppression, and the digital age.

Reception

Reviews
 The Guardian
 The Independent
The New York Times
NPR
Kenyon Review
Christian Science Monitor
USA Today
The Washington Post

Awards and nominations
 2016 Art Seidenbaum Award for First Fiction of the Los Angeles Times Book Prize (Won)
NBCC Leonard Award for Best Debut of the Year (Nominated)

Book of the Year 
 New York Times
 The Washington Post
 NPR
 Amazon
 Slate
 The Huffington Post
 The Guardian
 Library Journal
 Buzzfeed
 Electric Lit
 Chicago Tribune
 USA Today
 Publisher's Lunch

#1 Book of the Year 
 Audible
 Entertainment Weekly

References

2016 American novels
2016 debut novels
Alfred A. Knopf books
Tragicomedy novels